St. Jorgen's Day, (Holiday of St. Jorgen, The Feast of St. Jorgen) is a 1930 Soviet, partly silent comedy film by Yakov Protazanov and starring Igor Ilyinsky.

Uncredited are the original novel by Harald Bergstedt, and the cues written by Ilf and Petrov (with the additional contribution of Sigizmund Krzhizhanovsky).

Plot summary
Before the church holiday celebrating St. Jorgen, the thief Korkis (Anatoly Ktorov) escapes from prison and mingles with the gathering celebrants. He sees the large amounts of money being made by those hosting the celebration, who are mainly clergy. Korkis cannot refrain from getting involved in this venture. Together with an accomplice (Igor Ilyinsky) they conceive and realize a way to fraudulently extract at least a small part of the money flowing into the hosts' coffers.

Cast
 Igor Ilyinsky as Franz Schulz
 Anatoly Ktorov as Michael Korkis
 Mikhail Klimov as adjunct of the St. Jorgen church
 Ivan Arkadin as treasurer of St. Jorgen Church
 Mariya Strelkova as Oleandra
 Vladimir Uralsky as conductor of the railway
 Anatoly Goryunov as relic seller

Credited crew
Director: Yakov Protazanov
Script: Yakov Protazanov, Vladimir Shveitser
Operator: P. Yermolov
Co-director: Porfiri Podobed
Composer: Sergei Bugoslavsky
Soundmaster: D. Blok
Zvuk: S. Yurtsev, N. Ozornov
Orchestra and chorus of Mezhrabpom-Film
Tagefon sound system

Part-talkie
Films from this period often combine silent and sound sequences.

Most of St. Jorgen's Day was shot without recorded sound. These sequences have Russian intertitles, an orchestral and choral score, and occasional sound effects (e.g. the sound of a hand knocking on a door) or added dialogue. A specific scene can use sound effects and intertitles together. The often-impressive exterior scenes were shot silent on location. Interspersed throughout the film are short indoor scenes with recorded sound. The opening credit sequence uses sound, with the principal performers speaking in costume as their characters.

Quotes
 «Primary task in a thief profession as in the saint profession is to vanish at right time!»
 «Learn how to handle it without a jemmy!»
 When I was just an infant... My dear poor mother had dropped me from the ...nth floor...
 - Please, make one more miracle - an ascension!- And how about ascendables? (Korkis, talking about money)

See also
The Tailor from Torzhok
The Three Million Trial
A Kiss From Mary Pickford

References

Rollberg, Peter. Historical Dictionary of Russian and Soviet Cinema.

External links
 

1930 films
Soviet black-and-white films
1930 comedy films
Soviet comedy films
Russian comedy films
Russian satirical films
Religious satire films
Films directed by Yakov Protazanov
Transitional sound comedy films
Films critical of Christianity and Christians
Russian black-and-white films